The black-capped speirops (Zosterops lugubris) is a species of bird in the family Zosteropidae. It was previously placed in the genus Speirops. It is endemic to São Tomé in São Tomé and Príncipe.

References

Birds described in 1848
Endemic birds of São Tomé and Príncipe
Zosterops
Taxonomy articles created by Polbot